Jean-Claude Floch (born September 25, 1953), known as Floc'h is a French illustrator, comics artist, and writer.  He is known for his use of the style known as ligne claire. His older brother Jean-Louis Floch was also a cartoonist and illustrator.

Biography

After a quick study at the École nationale supérieure des arts décoratifs (School of Decorative Arts) in Paris, he dedicated himself to illustration and comics.  His first published comics pages were for the story Le Conservateur, written by Rodolphe, which appeared in Imagine in 1975.  The comics character "Sir Francis Albany" was created for Pilote magazine by Floc'h in 1977, and collaborating with François Rivière, Floc’h published his first collection of comics in 1977, Le Rendez-vous de Sevenoaks.  He and Rivière devoted themselves to a narrative and illustration style characterized by Anglophilia; the technique known as mise en abyme; as well as a ligne claire drawing style inspired by the Belgian tradition of comics illustration pioneered by Hergé and Edgar P. Jacobs.  Together they would create the series known as Une trilogie anglaise (An English Trilogy), which debuted in 1977.

Floc'h’s fame grew with the publication of Le Dossier Harding in 1980. Floc'h created commercial illustrations, in which he explored new drawing techniques and developed a personal style based on graphic minimalism such as in Le Secret de la Pulmoll verte in 1980.  In 1991, he collaborated with Jean-Luc Fromental on a collection of cartoons inspired by the work of F. Scott Fitzgerald, Jamais deux sans trois.  They also collaborated on the books Ma Vie, Life, High Life and Var, le Département dont vous êtes le Heros.

Floc'h and François Rivière collaborated on the novel Les Chroniques d'Oliver Alban, Diary of an Ironist (2006), in which they explored the art and literature from two decades: the 1940s and the 1970s.  The two wrote the texts, with Floc'h also creating the art for the book.

In 2007, Floc'h published a very personal work in the form of his book Une vie de rêve: Fragments d’une autobiographie idéale, in which he lives a long life that extends from 360 BC to May 4, 2046, during the course of which he fulfills various fantasies (for example, he becomes a student of Plato and poses for Philippe Halsman).

Known mainly for cartoons and illustrations, Floc’h has however exhibited his art at various galleries, including the Pixi gallery in Paris and the Nicholas Davies Gallery in New York City.  Floc'h has also designed book covers as well as various movie posters, such as for Diabolo menthe and Smoking / No Smoking, and created illustrations for various newspapers and magazines in France, including Lire, Senso, Monsieur, L'Express, Le Nouvel Observateur, Libération, Le Monde, Le Figaro, and Elle.  In the United States, he has created covers and illustrations for GQ and The New Yorker.  A collection of his advertising artwork appeared in 1985 as Un Homme dans la Foule.

Works

Comics

Collections of Comics 
 1977 : Le Rendez-vous de Sevenoaks, with François Rivière (Dargaud)
 1980 : Le Dossier Harding, with François Rivière (Dargaud)
 1983 : Blitz, with François Rivière (Le Matin / Albin Michel)
 1984 : À la recherche de Sir Malcolm, with François Rivière (Dargaud)
 1991 : Jamais deux sans trois, with  Jean-Luc Fromental (Albin Michel)
 1992 : Une trilogie anglaise, with François Rivière (Dargaud)
 1996 : Underground, with François Rivière (Albin Michel)
 2005 : Olivia Sturgess : 1914-2004, with François Rivière (Dargaud)
 2009 : Black Out et autres histoires du Blitz, with François Rivière (Dargaud)

Limited Editions (Tirages de tête) 
 1984 : À la recherche de Sir Malcolm, with François Rivière.
 1985 : Un homme dans la foule.
 1985 : Un homme dans la foule.
 1992 : À propos de Francis.
 2005 : Olivia Sturgess : 1914-2004, with François Rivière.

Illustration

Illustrated books 
 1985 : Ma vie, with  Jean-Luc Fromental (Les Humanoïdes Associés)
 1985 : Life, with Jean-Luc Fromental (Carton)
 1986 : High Life, with  Jean-Luc Fromental  (Carton)
 1986 : Banque de France, collective work. Illustrations recto verso are of two bank notes, one depicting Raymond Loewy, the other Jean Cocteau (Carton)
 1994 : Meurtre en miniature, with François Rivière (Dargaud)
 1994 : Journal d'un New-Yorkais, with Michel Jourde (Dargaud / Champaka)
 1997 : Ma vie 2 (Dargaud)
 1998 : Exposition, with Michel Jourde (Reporter / Galerie Médicis)
 2007 : Une vie de rêve (Robert Laffont)

Film Posters 
 1977 : Diabolo menthe by Diane Kurys
 1980 : Cocktail Molotov by Diane Kurys
 1992 : Smoking/No Smoking by Alain Resnais
 1997 : On connaît la chanson by Alain Resnais
 1998 : Harry dans tous ses états (Deconstructing Harry) by Woody Allen
 1999 : La Bûche by Danièle Thompson
 2001 : Liberté-Oléron by Bruno Podalydès
 2001 : Vertiges by l'amour by Laurent Chouchan
 2002 : Hollywood Ending by Woody Allen
 2003 : Petites coupures by Pascal Bonitzer
 2003 : Pas sur la bouche by Alain Resnais
 2005 : Melinda and Melinda by Woody Allen
 2005 : L'Anniversaire by Diane Kurys
 2008 : Le Grand Alibi by Pascal Bonitzer

Novels 
2006 : Les Chroniques d'Oliver Alban, with François Rivière (Robert Laffont)

References

External links 
Floc’h on Lambiek.net
  L'homme dans la foule : blog devoted to Floc'h
   Floc’h et Rivière : construction d’une œuvre : article concerning collaborations of Floc'h and François Rivière
   Exposition Faces : exposition à la Galerie Pixi en 2001
   Exposition Life - High Life - Life after Life : Galerie Pixi exhibition in 2003
 The New Yorker  : New Yorker covers
    : couvertures pour la collection Marginalia (n°1 et 14)
   So British! : portrait of Floc'h for the magazine Bretons n°15 (November 2006)
   La Vie rêvée de Floc'h : portfolio of illustrations for Une vie de rêve for the magazine Bretons n°26 (November 2007)
   Entretien audio accordé par Floc'h à ExpressBD
   Filmographie : movie posters by Floc'h for CinEmotions
   Lire : Le livre de leur enfance 

French illustrators
French comics artists
1953 births
Living people
French people of Breton descent